Mmamoloko Tryphosa Kubayi (born 8 May 1978) is a South African politician who is the Minister of Human Settlements and a Member of the National Assembly for the African National Congress (ANC). She is also the current head of the African National Congress's economic transformation subcommittee in the national executive committee (NEC). She was the Minister of Energy in 2017, the Minister of Communications from 2017 to 2018, the Minister of Science and Technology from 2018 to 2019, and the Minister of Tourism from 2019 to 2021.

Early life, education and career
Mmamoloko Kubayi was born and raised in Soweto. She and her family lived in a shack. Her mother was a domestic worker and an African National Congress supporter. Kubayi became pregnant at the age of 17 and gave birth to a son. Despite challenges, she matriculated from Thusa-Setjhaba Secondary School in 1997 as the school's top achiever and subsequently became involved in student politics. She attended the Vista University's Soweto campus and graduated with a BA Degree in Psychology and Sociology in 2000. She achieved a Project Management Diploma from Damelin in 2002.

Kubayi was first employed as a Community Developer in the non-governmental sector. She was soon employed at First National Bank as a Skills Development Specialist, and, later on, found employment in the Business Banking Division at Nedbank. She soon worked in the public sector as a Skills Development Facilitator at the National Health Laboratory Services.

In 2015, she achieved a master's degree in Public Administration from the University of the Witwatersrand.

Political career and activism
Kubayi, while still in Vista University, joined the ANC Youth League and was elected to the university's SRC. After working at the National Health Laboratory Services, she briefly became a director in the Office of the then-Deputy President of South Africa, Phumzile Mlambo-Ngcuka.

In 2006, she was elected an ANC PR Councillor of the City of Johannesburg and became the Chairperson of the municipality's Portfolio Committee on Transport. At that exact time, she also served as a Provincial Executive Council (PEC) member of the ANC Youth League in Gauteng and soon became the Deputy Provincial Secretary of the ANCYL.

Kubayi was elected a Member of Parliament in 2009. She then worked as the Parliamentary Counsellor to the newly appointed Deputy President of South Africa, Kgalema Motlanthe.

In her capacity as an MP, she has served as a Whip of the Parliamentary Committees on Basic and Higher Education and Training, Private Members’ Legislative Proposals and Petitions. She was also acting Deputy Chief Whip of the ANC Caucus and a member of the Standing Committee on Appropriations, the Rules Committee and the Programming Committee. Most recently, she served as Chairperson of both the Telecommunications and Postal Services Portfolio Committees.

In March 2017, President Jacob Zuma appointed her as the new Minister of Energy. She succeeded Tina Joemat-Pettersson. Her appointment was seen as an advancement for the implementation of the controversial nuclear deal.

She briefly served until October 2017 when she was named Minister of Communications. In February 2018, newly appointed President Cyril Ramaphosa announced her as Minister of Science and Technology.

Following the May 2019 elections, Kubayi was appointed Minister of Tourism, succeeding Derek Hanekom. In June 2021, she was appointed acting minister of health after Zweli Mkhize was placed on leave over corruption allegations.

During a cabinet reshuffle on 5 August 2021, Kubayi was appointed as Minister of Human Settlements by president Ramaphosa.

Personal life
She married Joel Sihle Ngubane on 16 September 2017 and separated in April 2021 They later finalised their divorce.

References

External links
 Ms Mmamoloko Tryphosa Kubayi-Ngubane at People's Assembly
 Mmamoloko Kubayi-Ngubane, Ms at South African Government

Living people
Government ministers of South Africa
Women government ministers of South Africa
African National Congress politicians
20th-century South African politicians
21st-century South African women politicians
Members of the National Assembly of South Africa
Women members of the National Assembly of South Africa
University of the Witwatersrand alumni
People from Soweto
21st-century South African politicians
1978 births